Cytochrome P4502C8 (CYP2C8) is a member of the cytochrome P450 mixed-function oxidase system involved in the metabolism of xenobiotics in the body. Cytochrome P4502C8 also possesses epoxygenase activity, i.e. it metabolizes long-chain polyunsaturated fatty acids, e.g. arachidonic acid, eicosapentaenoic acid, docosahexaenoic acid, and Linoleic acid to their biologically active epoxides.

Ligands 
Following is a table of selected substrates, inducers and inhibitors of 2C8.

Inhibitors of CYP2C8 can be classified by their potency, such as:
Strong inhibitor being one that causes at least a five-fold increase in the plasma AUC values, or more than 80% decrease in clearance.
Moderate inhibitor being one that causes at least a two-fold increase in the plasma AUC values, or 50-80% decrease in clearance.
Weak inhibitor being one that causes at least a 1.25-fold but less than two-fold increase in the plasma AUC values, or 20-50% decrease in clearance.

Where classes of agents are listed, there may be exceptions within the class.

Epoxygenase activity 
CYP2C8 also possesses epoxygenase activity: it is one of the principal enzymes responsible for attacking various long-chain polyunsaturated fatty acids at their double (i.e. alkene) bonds to form epoxide products that act as signaling agents. It metabolizes: 1) arachidonic acid to various epoxyeicosatrienoic acids (also termed EETs); 2) linoleic acid to 9,10-epoxy octadecenoic acids (also termed vernolic acid, linoleic acid 9:10-oxide, or leukotoxin) and 12,13-epoxy-octadecenoic (also termed coronaric acid, linoleic acid 12,13-oxide, or isoleukotoxin); 3) docosahexaenoic acid to various epoxydocosapentaenoic acids (also termed EDPs); and 4) eicosapentaenoic acid to various epoxyeicosatetraenoic acids (also termed EEQs).

Along with CYP2C8, CYP2C9, CYP2C19, CYP2J2, and possibly CYP2S1 are the main producers of EETs and, very likely, EEQs, EDPs, and the epoxides of linoleic acid.

See also 
Cytochrome P450 oxidase
Epoxygenase

References

External links

Further reading 

 
 
 
 
 
 
 
 
 
 
 
 
 
 
 
 
 
 

2